Ancaster may refer to:

Ancaster, Lincolnshire, England
Ancaster, Ontario, Canada
Gilbert Heathcote-Drummond-Willoughby, 3rd Earl of Ancaster, last holder of the now-extinct Earldom of Ancaster
Ancaster (tugboat), one of Canada's museum ships

See also
 Ancaster stone